These genera belong to Diaperinae, a subfamily of darkling beetles in the family Tenebrionidae.

Diaperinae genera

 Adelina Dejean, 1835  (North America, the Neotropics, the Palearctic, Indomalaya, and Australasia)
 Ades Guérin-Méneville, 1857  (the Palearctic, tropical Africa, Indomalaya, Australasia, and Oceania)
 Alphitophagus Stephens, 1832  (North America, tropical Africa, Australasia, and Oceania)
 Anommabates Koch, 1956  (tropical Africa)
 Anopidium Jeannel & Paulian, 1945  (tropical Africa)
 Apteroseriscius Koch, 1950  (tropical Africa)
 Arabcynaeus Schawaller, 2009  (the Palearctic)
 Araeopselaphus Gebien, 1921  (tropical Africa)
 Basanus Lacordaire, 1859  (the Palearctic and Indomalaya)
 Basides Motschulsky, 1873  (the Palearctic, Indomalaya, and Australasia)
 Betschia Dajoz, 1980  (tropical Africa)
 Brittona G.S. Medvedev & Lawrence, 1986  (Australasia)
 Caecochares Koch, 1956  (tropical Africa)
 Caecophloeus Dajoz, 1972  (the Neotropics)
 Capicrypticus Koch, 1950  (tropical Africa)
 Cechenosternum Gebien, 1921  (the Palearctic, tropical Africa, and Indomalaya)
 Ceropria Laporte & Brullé, 1831  (the Neotropics, tropical Africa, Indomalaya, Australasia, and Oceania)
 Cheilopoma Murray, 1867  (tropical Africa)
 Cissides Chatanay, 1915  (tropical Africa)
 Coelopleurum Gebien, 1921  (tropical Africa)
 Corticeus Piller & Mitterpacher, 1783  (worldwide)
 Cosmonota Blanchard, 1842  (the Neotropics)
 Crypsis C.O. Waterhouse, 1877  (the Palearctic and Indomalaya)
 Crypticus Latreille, 1816  (the Palearctic)
 Cryptozoon Schaufuss, 1882  (the Neotropics)
 Csiro G.S. Medvedev & Lawrence, 1984  (Australasia)
 Cyclobiomorphus Pic, 1916  (Indomalaya)
 Cyclobium Pic, 1916  (Indomalaya)
 Cynaeus Leconte, 1862  (North America, the Palearctic, and Australasia)
 Derispia Lewis, 1894  (the Palearctic, Indomalaya, and Australasia)
 Derispiella Kaszab, 1961  (Indomalaya)
 Derispiola Kaszab, 1946  (Indomalaya)
 Diaperis Geoffroy, 1762  (North America, the Neotropics, the Palearctic, and Indomalaya)
 Doliodesmus Spilman, 1967  (North America)
 Doliopines Horn, 1894  (North America)
 Ectyche Pascoe, 1869  (Australasia)
 Ellipsodes Wollaston, 1854  (the Neotropics, tropical Africa, Indomalaya, Australasia, and Oceania)
 Emypsara Pascoe, 1866  (the Palearctic)
 Enanea Lewis, 1894  (the Palearctic and Indomalaya)
 Espagnolina Kaszab, 1965  (Indomalaya)
 Exapinaeus Pascoe, 1882  (the Neotropics)
 Falsocosmonota Kaszab, 1962  (Indomalaya)
 Gargilius Fairmaire, 1891  (tropical Africa)
 Gnathidium Gebien, 1921  (tropical Africa)
 Gnatocerus Thunberg, 1814  (worldwide)
 Gondwanocrypticus Español, 1955  (North America and the Neotropics)
 Gressittiola Kaszab, 1955  (Australasia)
 Halammobia Semenov, 1901  (the Palearctic)
 Heterophylus Klug, 1833  (tropical Africa)
 Hoplaspis Motschulsky, 1858  (Indomalaya)
 Hyocis Pascoe, 1866  (Australasia)
 Iccius Champion, 1886  (North America and the Neotropics)
 Ischnarthron Gebien, 1921  (tropical Africa)
 Lamprocrypticus Español, 1950  (the Palearctic)
 Laoscapha Schawaller, 2016  (Indomalaya)
 Leiochrinus Westwood, 1883  (the Palearctic, Indomalaya, and Australasia)
 Leiochrodinus Kaszab, 1961  (Indomalaya)
 Leiochrodontes Kaszab, 1946  (Indomalaya)
 Leiochrota Westwood, 1883  (Indomalaya)
 Lelegeis Champion, 1886  (the Neotropics)
 Lineocrypticus Koch, 1950  (tropical Africa)
 Liodema Horn, 1870  (North America and the Neotropics)
 Louwerensia Kaszab, 1964  (Australasia)
 Loxostethus Triplehorn, 1962  (the Neotropics)
 Macrotrachyscelis Pic, 1925  (tropical Africa)
 Magela G.S. Medvedev & Lawrence, 1986  (Australasia)
 Mauritianopidium Dajoz, 1977  (tropical Africa)
 Menimopsis Champion, 1896  (the Neotropics)
 Menimus Sharp, 1876  (the Palearctic, Indomalaya, Australasia, and Oceania)
 Micrectyche Bates, 1873  (Australasia)
 Microcrypticus Gebien, 1921  (tropical Africa and Indomalaya)
 Micropeneta Pic, 1921  (Indomalaya)
 Mireanopidium Dajoz, 1977  (tropical Africa)
 Mophis Champion, 1886  (the Neotropics)
 Myonophloeus Bremer & Lillig, 2017  (the Neotropics)
 Myrmechixenus Chevrolat, 1835  (North America, tropical Africa, Indomalaya, Australasia, and Oceania)
 Myrmecocatops Wasmann, 1897  (tropical Africa)
 Nanocaecus Schawaller & Purchart, 2012  (tropical Africa)
 Neanopidium Dajoz, 1975  (the Neotropics)
 Neomida Latreille, 1829  (North America, the Neotropics, the Palearctic, and Indomalaya)
 Neoplateia Marcuzzi, 1986  (the Neotropics)
 Oochrotus P.H. Lucas, 1852  (the Palearctic)
 Pachyphaleria Gebien, 1920  (tropical Africa)
 Palembomimus Matthews & Lawrence, 2005  (Australasia)
 Paniasis Champion, 1886  (the Neotropics)
 Parahyocis Kaszab, 1955  (Australasia and Oceania)
 Paralyreus Grouvelle, 1918  (tropical Africa)
 Paranemia Heyden, 1892  (the Palearctic)
 Paranopidium Dajoz, 1974  (tropical Africa)
 Pelleas Bates, 1872  (the Palearctic)
 Pentaphyllus Dejean, 1821  (worldwide)
 Peyrierasia Dajoz, 1975  (tropical Africa)
 Phaleria Latreille, 1802  (worldwide)
 Phaleromela Reitter, 1916  (North America and the Palearctic)
 Phayllus Champion, 1886  (the Neotropics)
 Phtora Germar, 1836  (the Palearctic and tropical Africa)
 Pimplema Pascoe, 1887  (Indomalaya and Australasia)
 Platydema Laporte & Brullé, 1831  (worldwide)
 Platydemoides Kaszab, 1980  (Indomalaya)
 Poecilocrypticus Gebien, 1928  (North America and the Neotropics)
 Pogonoxenus Wasmann, 1899  (tropical Africa)
 Prototyrtaeus Spiessberger & Ivie, 2020  (the Neotropics)
 Pseudanopidium Dajoz, 1974  (tropical Africa)
 Pseudobasides Pic, 1916  (Indomalaya)
 Pseudoenanea Pic, 1924  (Indomalaya)
 Pseudoscaphidema Pic, 1926  (the Palearctic)
 Pseudoseriscius Español, 1950  (the Palearctic and tropical Africa)
 Sakaiomenimus Ando, 2003  (the Palearctic)
 Saptine Champion, 1886  (the Neotropics)
 Scaphidema Redtenbacher, 1848  (North America, the Palearctic, and Indomalaya)
 Sciophagus Sharp, 1885  (Australasia and Oceania)
 Sitophagus Mulsant, 1854  (North America and the Neotropics)
 Sphaerognathium Dajoz, 1975  (the Neotropics)
 Spiloscapha Bates, 1873  (the Palearctic, Indomalaya, and Australasia)
 Stenoscapha Bates, 1873  (the Neotropics)
 Stethotrypes Gebien, 1914  (Indomalaya)
 Stomylus Fåhraeus, 1870  (tropical Africa)
 Szentivanya Kaszab, 1958  (Australasia)
 Taiwanomenimus Masumoto, Akita & Lee, 2019  (Indomalaya)
 Taiwanotrachyscelis Masumoto, Akita & Lee, 2012  (Indomalaya)
 Trachyscelis Latreille, 1809  (North America, the Palearctic, Indomalaya, Australasia, and Oceania)
 Triplehornia Matthews & Lawrence, 2005  (Australasia)
 Typhlophloeus Jeannel & Paulian, 1945  (the Palearctic and tropical Africa)
 Tyrtaeus Champion, 1913  (the Neotropics, tropical Africa, and Australasia)
 Ulomoides Blackburn, 1888  (the Neotropics, tropical Africa, Australasia, and Oceania)
 Uptona G.S. Medvedev & Lawrence, 1986  (Australasia)
 Yamatotakeru Ando, 2015  (the Palearctic and Indomalaya)
 † Palaeobasanus Nabozhenko & Kirejtshuk, 2020

References